Lazy Day or Lazy Days may refer to:

Film and TV
Lazy Days (film), a 1929 film directed by Robert F. McGowan
"Lazy Day", 1981 episode of The Sooty Show

Music

Albums
Lazy Days, album by Stuart Jones (composer) 2000
Lazy Days, album by Ana Egge 2007

Songs
"Lazy Day", a song by New York pop band The Left Banke from Walk Away Renée/Pretty Ballerina  1967 
"Lazy Day" (Spanky and Our Gang song), 1967
"Lazy Day" (The Moody Blues song), 1969
"Lazy Day", a song by The Boo Radleys from Everything's Alright Forever  
"Lazy Day", a song by Us3 from Hand on the Torch 1993
"Lazy Days", a song from the album Life thru a Lens by Robbie Williams 1997
"Lazy Days" (Gram Parsons song) 1967
"Lazy Days", song by Chris Andrews (singer)	1972
"Lazy Days", song by John Paul Young Love Is in the Air (studio album)	1978
"Lazy Days", song by Leona Naess from Comatised 2000
"Lazy Days", song by Enya  from A Day Without Rain
"Lazy Days", last single of Debbie (singer) 1988
"Lazy Days", song by Toshiko Akiyoshi from Dig (Toshiko Akiyoshi album) 1993
"Lazy Days", song by Tesla from Standing Room Only (Tesla album)
"Lazy Days", song by Dean Brody from Dean Brody (album)
"Lazy Days", song by Aaron Smith from Shwayze (album)
"Lazy Days", song by Red Hot (band) and Adrian Lee
"Lazy Days", song by Beulah (singer)
"Lazy Days", song by Cheap Time
"Lazy Days", song by Steve Wickham